Fernandes is a patronymic surname in the Portuguese-speaking countries. The name is a patronymic form of the Portuguese and Spanish personal name Fernando. Fernandes is the 243rd most common surname in the world, the 3rd one in Angola and in São Tomé and Príncipe, the 10th one in Portugal and the 18th one in Brazil. The Spanish version of this surname is Fernández.

People with the surname Fernandes include

Explorers
Álvaro Fernandes, Portuguese explorer and navigator
António Fernandes, Portuguese explorer
Baltasar Fernandes, Portuguese explorer of Brazil
Duarte Fernandes, Portuguese explorer and diplomat
João Fernandes Lavrador, Portuguese explorer
Pedro Fernandes de Queirós, Portuguese explorer

Academics
Florestan Fernandes, Brazilian sociologist and politician 
Jane Fernandes, president-designate of Gallaudet University
Norma Fernandes, Pakistani Catholic teacher, honored with Tamgha-i-Imtiaz
Rosette Batarda Fernandes, Portuguese botanist

In Arts and Entertainment
Ana Rocha Fernandes, Cape Verdian film director, editor and screenwriter
Erica Fernandes, Indian TV actress and model
John Fernandes, American musician
Manuel Gardner Fernandes, German musician
Maria Celestina Fernandes (born 1945), Angolan author, mostly of children's books
Nomi Fernandes, Swiss glamour model
Paula Fernandes, Brazilian singer
Shawn Desman, Canadian singer
Remo Fernandes, Indian musician
Vânia Fernandes, Portuguese singer
Vasco Fernandes, known as Grão Vasco, Portuguese painter
Vivian Wilson da Silva Fernandes, Indian Rapper from Mumbai, India, also known as DIVINE

In Business
Tony Fernandes, Malaysian entrepreneur

In Politics
Emanuel Jardim Fernandes (born 1944), Portuguese politician
Joaquim Teófilo Fernandes Braga, Portuguese politician, writer and playwright
Maria Domingas Fernandes Alves, East Timorese politician
Oscar Fernandes, Indian politician
George Fernandes, Indian politician, former Minister of Defence 
Suella Fernandes, British Conservative Party politician, Member of Parliament (MP) for Fareham since 2015

In Sports
Aaron Fernandes, Canadian field hockey player
Alex Fernandes, Brazilian football striker
Alfred Fernandes, Indian football coach
Ashley Fernandes, Indian football player
Bibiano Fernandes (footballer), Indian football player
Brandon Fernandes, Indian football player
Bruno Fernandes (footballer, born 1994), Portuguese football player
Cajetan Fernandes Indian football player
Cláudio Roberto Siqueira Fernandes, Brazilian footballer
Clyde Fernandes, Indian football player
Dawson Fernandes Indian football player
Emanuel Fernandes (beach volleyball) (born 1967), Angolan beach volleyball player
Fabrice Fernandes, French footballer
Flávia Fernandes, Brazilian water polo player
Francis Fernandes, Indian football player
Gabriel Fernandes, Indian football player
Gedson Fernandes, Portuguese football player
Gelson Fernandes, Swiss footballer
Kingsley Fernandes, Indian football player
James Fernandes Indian football player
Jean-Claude Fernandes, French football player
Júlio César Fernandes, Brazilian footballer
Junior Fernandes, Brazilian-Chilean football player
Manuel Henriques Fernandes, Portuguese football player
Mário Fernandes, Russian football player
Micky Fernandes, Indian football player
Myron Fernandes Indian football player
Nicholas Fernandes, Indian football player
Nicolette Fernandes (born 1983), Guyanese squash player
Raynier Fernandes, Indian football player
Rodrigo Fernandes Valete, Brazilian football player
Romeo Fernandes, Indian football player
Selwyn Fernandes, Indian football player
Seriton Fernandes, Indian football player
Vanderlei Fernandes Silva, Brazilian football player
Vanessa Fernandes, Portuguese triathlete
Victorino Fernandes Indian football player
Fernandes (footballer, born 1926), Joaquim Fernandes da Silva (1926–2009), Portuguese defender
Fernandes (footballer, born 1985), Micerlanio Fernandes da Silva, Brazilian midfielder
Fernandes (footballer, born 1995), Jonathan da Silveira Fernandes Reis, Brazilian midfielder

Others
Angelo Innocent Fernandes (1913-2000), Goan Catholic cleric, Archbishop of Delhi from 16 September 1967 - 27 January 1991
Earl Kenneth Fernandes (born 1972), first Indian American Latin Rite Catholic bishop
Fernandes Guitars, a guitar and guitar accessory manufacturer

See also
 Fernández
 Hernandes
 Hernández

References

Portuguese-language surnames
Patronymic surnames
Surnames from given names